Mikko Juhani Kavén (born 19 February 1975) is a retired Finnish football goalkeeper who used to play for Tampere United in Finland's Veikkausliiga.

He is currently acting as goalkeeping coach in Veikkausliiga side Ilves.

Trivia
Kavén has also played for Kuusysi and HJK Helsinki in Finland and for Motherwell F.C. in Scotland and Vålerenga I.F. in Norway.

International
Kavén played 15 times for Finnish national team before retiring from international games in January 2008.

References

1975 births
Living people
Sportspeople from Lahti
Finnish footballers
Finnish expatriate footballers
Association football goalkeepers
Finland international footballers
Helsingin Jalkapalloklubi players
Motherwell F.C. players
Vålerenga Fotball players
Tampere United players
Veikkausliiga players
Scottish Premier League players
Eliteserien players
Expatriate footballers in Scotland
Expatriate footballers in Norway
Finnish expatriate sportspeople in Norway